Bjargtangar (regionally also ) is the westernmost point of Iceland and is considered the westernmost point of Europe outside the mid-Atlantic archipelago of Azores (which are often classified as remote islands). It is the westernmost point in the Greenwich Mean Time (GMT) time zone.

See also 
 Bjargtangar Lighthouse
 Látrabjarg

References

External links 
 Jan S. Krogh's Geosite on Bjargtangar

Westfjords